David Harum is a 1915 American silent comedy-drama romance film written and directed by Allan Dwan, produced by Famous Players Film Company and distributed by Paramount Pictures.  It is based on the 1899 novel of the same name by Edward Noyes Westcott and the 1900 Broadway play based on the novel, starring William H. Crane (Crane also starred in two subsequent Broadway revivals). Crane agreed to star in the film (which was his debut) only if the film was written exactly as the play. David Harum is the only film of Dwan's for Famous Players that still survives. A print is preserved at the George Eastman House in Rochester, New York and the Cinémathèque Française in Paris.

The novel was again adapted for the screen in 1934 starring Will Rogers in the title role.

Plot

Cast
May Allison - Mary Blake
Harold Lockwood - John Lenox
William H. Crane - David Harum
Kate Meeks - Aunt Polly, David's sister
Hal Clarendon - Chet Timson
Guy Nichols - Deacon Perkins
Russell Bassett - Bit role

References

External links

1910s romantic comedy-drama films
American romantic comedy-drama films
American silent feature films
American black-and-white films
Films based on American novels
American films based on plays
Films directed by Allan Dwan
Films set in New York (state)
Paramount Pictures films
Films based on multiple works
Films based on adaptations
1915 comedy films
1915 films
1915 drama films
1910s American films
1910s English-language films
Silent romantic comedy-drama films
Silent American comedy-drama films